Paco the Elegant (Spanish:Paco, el elegante) is a 1952 Mexican crime film directed by Adolfo Fernández Bustamante and starring Antonio Badú, Emilia Guiú and Carlos Cores. It was produced by Fernando de Fuentes.

External links
 

1952 films
1950s Spanish-language films
Films directed by Adolfo Fernández Bustamante
Mexican crime films
1952 crime films
Mexican black-and-white films
1950s Mexican films